Persoonia helix is a species of flowering plant in the family Proteaceae and is endemic to the south-west of Western Australia.

Description

Taxonomy
Persoonia helix was first formally described in 1994 by Peter Weston in the journal Telopea from specimens collected by Fred Lullfitz near Forrestania in 1964.

Distribution and habitat
This geebung grows in heath and woodland in the area between Kalgoorlie, Hyden, Ravensthorpe and Salmon Gums in the Coolgardie, Esperance Plains and Mallee biogeographic regions.

Conservation status
This species is classified as "not threatened" by the Western Australian Government Department of Parks and Wildlife.

References

helix
Flora of Western Australia
Plants described in 1994
Taxa named by Peter H. Weston